The 2004 Petit Le Mans was the eighth race for the 2004 American Le Mans Series season and held at Road Atlanta.  It took place on September 25, 2004.

Official results

Class winners in bold.  Cars failing to complete 70% of winner's distance marked as Not Classified (NC).

Statistics
 Pole Position - #16 Dyson Racing - 1:12.136
 Fastest Lap - #38 ADT Champion Racing - 1:13.315
 Distance - 
 Average Speed -

External links

 

P
Petit Le Mans